Anthony of Novgorod (fl. 13th century) was a archbishop and saint.

Born Dobryna Jadrejkovich to a wealthy family, around 1190 he joined the monastery of Khutyn. In 1200, he undertook a pilgrimage to Constantinople and wrote an account of his journey in his Pilgrim's Book, which is of interest to historians for its description of the city and its religious monuments. After the archbishop of Novgorod was banished, Anthony temporarily ascended to the role, but returned the see when his predecessor was permitted to return. Anthony again became the archbishop in 1225, then remained in the position until retiring in 1228 for health reasons. He died c. 1231–1232 after a disease had rendered him mute.

References

Archbishops and Metropolitans of Novgorod